Bloodaxe can refer to:
Eric Bloodaxe (c. 885 – 954), a Viking king
Erik Bloodaxe (hacker),  an alias of American computer hacker Chris Goggans
Bloodaxe Books, a British publishing house specializing in poetry
Bloodaxe (comics), a Marvel Comics anti-hero
 Brian Bloodaxe, a British platform game
 B'hrian Bloodaxe, a Discworld character
 Bloodaxe, a nickname of Danish cricketer Ole Mortensen (born 1958)